The 32nd Pan American Judo Championships were held in Centre Pierre Charbonneau in Montreal, Quebec, Canada from 24 May to 27 May 2007.

Medal overview

Men's events

Women's events

Medals table

Notes

External links
 
 Canada Judo (Official results)
 US Judo (May 24, 2007)
 US Judo (May 25, 2007)

American Championships
Judo
2007
Judo competitions in Canada
International sports competitions hosted by Canada